La Nation is the government-owned newspaper of Benin. It was renamed from Ehuzu during the transition to democracy in Benin.

See also
List of newspapers in Benin

References

External links
Official website

Newspapers published in Benin
French-language newspapers published in Africa